Celt is an unincorporated community in northeastern Dallas County, Missouri, United States. It is located along Missouri Route E on the north bank of Mill Creek just over one mile west of that streams confluence with the Niangua River.

History
The settlement's name was furnished by the Postal Service when it established an office there in 1888.  Celt is also called "Mill Creek" because four water mills were located nearby.

The post office closed in 1968.

The now-abandoned Celt School was located in the settlement in the early 1940s.

Celt is part of the Springfield, Missouri Metropolitan Statistical Area.

References

Unincorporated communities in Dallas County, Missouri
Springfield metropolitan area, Missouri
Unincorporated communities in Missouri